Cielętniki  is a village in the administrative district of Gmina Dąbrowa Zielona, within Częstochowa County, Silesian Voivodeship, in southern Poland.

The village has a population of 457.

In the Cielętniki grows the largest tree in Poland — it is monumental lime tree, known as Lime in Cielętniki.

History
The Palace in the center of the village was built by the Kurnatowski family, as was the church.

On September 4, 1939, during the German invasion of Poland which started World War II, German troops carried out a massacre of Polish farmers and children in the village (see Nazi crimes against the Polish nation).

References

Villages in Częstochowa County
Palaces in Poland
Nazi war crimes in Poland